Julie Stepan (born March 30, 1986 in Grand Prairie, Texas) is a professional drag racer, and a media / broadcasting professional.

Achievements and awards
 In 2004, she won the Subaru Easy Street female driver search at the age of 18.
 In 2005, she ended her first season with Subaru ESX winning 4 NHRA "Wally" trophies.
 In 2006, she won 6 more NHRA Wallies with Subaru ESX and ended the season as the Sport RWD Series Champion while driving a 1000 hp 2006 STI
 After Subaru and ESX parted ways she accepted a new driver spot in the Marty Ladwig Racing team for 2007.
 She is now modeling and acting in the L.A. area and doing some TV hosting gigs with ESPN.

Championships

2006 
 NHRA Sport RWD CHAMPION

References 
 SuperStreet Interview with Julie Stepan
 Racing With Julie Stepan
 SubDriven announcing Julie Stepan
 Julie Stepan On the Run with NHRA Xplod Sport Compact Series
 Stock Photos of Julie Stepan
 Julie Stepan Hair Modeling
 Julie Stepan Joins Marty Ladwig Racing

External links 
 

Dragster drivers
1986 births
Living people
Female models from Texas
American female racing drivers
People from Grand Prairie, Texas
Racing drivers from Texas
21st-century American women